Planktothrix agardhii is a species of cyanobacteria belonging to the family Oscillatoriaceae.

It has cosmopolitan distribution.

References

Cyanobacteria